The Bentonville Third Street Historic District is a residential historic district just southeast of the central business district of Bentonville, Arkansas.  It covers two blocks of SE Third Street, between Main and B Streets, including fourteen properties on Third Street and adjacent cross streets.  This area, developed principally after the arrival in Bentonville of the railroad in 1881, is reflective of the high-style architecture of the late 19th and early 20th centuries that had not previously been widespread in Benton County.  All of the houses are one to  stories in height, and all are wood frame, except the Elliott House, a brick house with an eclectic combination of Italianate and Second Empire styles.

The district was listed on the National Register of Historic Places in 1993.

See also
National Register of Historic Places listings in Benton County, Arkansas

References

Italianate architecture in Arkansas
Colonial Revival architecture in Arkansas
Historic districts in Benton County, Arkansas
Historic districts on the National Register of Historic Places in Arkansas
National Register of Historic Places in Bentonville, Arkansas
American Craftsman architecture in Arkansas
Bungalow architecture in Arkansas